Pizzo di Vogorno is a mountain in the Lepontine Alps of Switzerland. It is located north-east of Lago di Vogorno and Vogorno, in the canton of Ticino.

References

External links
 Pizzo di Vogorno on Summitpost
 Pizzo di Vogorno on Hikr

Lepontine Alps
Mountains of the Alps
Mountains of Switzerland
Mountains of Ticino